Ellis is an unincorporated community in Custer County, Idaho, United States, located on U.S. Route 93  northeast of Challis. The town consists solely of a post office, with ZIP code 83235.

History
Ellis appears on state maps as early as 1887. Ellis' population was 20 in 1909, and 10 in 1960. Ellis once had its own store and cafe, which burned down in 1975; the fire also damaged the post office, which was relocated to a new building as a result.

References

Unincorporated communities in Custer County, Idaho
Unincorporated communities in Idaho